The Higashiyama culture (東山文化 Higashiyama bunka) is a segment of Japanese culture that includes innovations in architecture, the visual arts and theatre during the late Muromachi period. It originated and was promoted in the 15th century by the shōgun Ashikaga Yoshimasa, after he retired to his villa in the eastern hills (東山 Higashiyama) of the capital city Kyoto.

History 

Based largely on the ideals and aesthetics of Zen Buddhism and the concept of wabi-sabi, Higashiyama culture centered on the development of chadō (Japanese tea ceremony), ikebana (flower arranging), Noh drama, and sumi-e ink painting. Much of what is commonly seen today as Japanese Zen aesthetics originated in this period. In this comparison Kinkaku-ji, representative of Kitayama culture is compared with Ginkaku-ji, representative of Higashiyama culture.

Yoshimasa's retirement villa was turned into the temple Ginkaku-ji (the Temple of the Silver Pavilion) after his death. It is situated in Kyoto's Sakyō-ku, and was the center of the Higashiyama cultural outgrowth and known for its Zen and wabi-sabi aesthetics. The retired shogun invited many artists, poets, and court nobles to his villa, encouraging the development of their arts. A vast and priceless collection of artifacts came together, which was known as the Higashiyama Treasure.

The Tōgu-Dō building structure includes a shoin-style room called the Dōjinsai. It originally had a fireplace built into the floor, and due to this, the Dōjinsai is considered the earliest extant example of a room designed for use as a tea room.
 
There were many architectural innovations in this period, exhibited in the Ginkaku-ji in particular, which would later become core elements in the shoin style of 17th century architecture. One of these elements was the tokonoma, a small alcove in which scrolls are hung, and flowers or other small articles are placed to enhance the aesthetic feel of the room. The great ink-painter Sesshū Tōyō spent much time at the Ginkaku-ji, and this period also saw the birth of the Kanō school of Japanese painting as well as an early version of the chanoyu tea ceremony. Tea ceremonies would be further formalized by Sen no Rikyū in the 16th century.

Important dates 

Notable dates within this period include:
 February 21, 1482 (Bummei 14 , 4th day of the 2nd month): Construction of the  Silver Pavilion commenced.
 January 27, 1490 (Entoku 2, 7th day of the 1st month):  The former-Shogun Yoshimasa died at age 56 in his Higashiyama-dono estate, which marks the beginning of the end of Higashiyama bunka.

Examples 
Examples of Higashiyama culture include:

Architecture
Ginkaku and Garden of Jishō-ji
Karesansui of Ryōan-ji 
Karesansui of Daisen-in

Calligraphy and painting
View of Ama-no-Hashidate by Sesshū (Kyoto National Museum)
Zhou Maoshu Appreciating Lotuses, a hanging scroll by Kanō Masanobu (Kyūshū National Museum)
Seikōji engi emaki by Tosa Mitsunobu (Tokyo National Museum)

See also
Culture of Japan
Japanese art
National Treasures of Japan

Notes

References
 "Higashiyama Bunka",   JAANUS: Japanese Architecture and Art Net Users System.
 Keene, Donald. (2003).  Yoshimasa and the Silver Pavilion: The Creation of the Soul of Japan. New York: Columbia University Press. ; OCLC 52268947 
 Titsingh, Isaac, ed. (1834), [Siyun-sai Rin-siyo/Hayashi Gahō, 1652], Nipon o daï itsi ran; ou, [https://books.google.com/books?id=18oNAAAAIAAJ&dq=nipon+o+dai+itsi+ran  Annales des empereurs du Japon.]  Paris: Oriental Translation Fund of Great Britain and Ireland.
 Sansom, George Bailey. (1943). "Japan: A Short Cultural History". New York: Appleton Century Crofts, Inc.
 Steiner, Evgeny. (2014). Zen-Life: Ikkyu and Beyond. Cambridge Scholars Publishing. .

Japanese culture
1460s in Japan
1470s in Japan
1480s in Japan